Cornelia Möhring (born 9 January 1960) is a German politician. Born in Hamburg, she represents The Left. Cornelia Möhring has served as a member of the Bundestag from the state of Schleswig-Holstein since 2009.

Life 
Cornelia Möhring completed an apprenticeship as an industrial clerk after her secondary school leaving certificate. After her second education, she studied social economics at the University of Applied Sciences in Hamburg with a focus on organizational sociology and social psychology. She became member of the bundestag after the 2009 German federal election. She is a member of the Committee for Labour and Social Affairs. She is the spokesperson for her group on women's policy.

References

External links 

  
 Bundestag biography 

1960 births
Living people
Members of the Bundestag for Schleswig-Holstein
Female members of the Bundestag
21st-century German women politicians
Members of the Bundestag 2021–2025
Members of the Bundestag 2017–2021
Members of the Bundestag 2013–2017
Members of the Bundestag 2009–2013
Members of the Bundestag for The Left
Politicians from Hamburg